Alexander MacLeod is a Canadian writer and professor of English, Creative Writing and Atlantic Canada Studies at Saint Mary's University in Halifax, Nova Scotia. His debut short-story collection Light Lifting was a shortlisted nominee for the 2010 Scotiabank Giller Prize and the 2011 Frank O'Connor International Short Story Award. It won the Margaret and John Savage First Book Award in the 2011 Atlantic Book Awards. In 2019, he won an O. Henry Award for his short story, "Lagomorph", which was first published in Granta.

The son of Canadian novelist and short-story writer Alistair MacLeod and of his wife, Anita MacLellan, he was born in Inverness, Nova Scotia in 1972 and raised in Windsor, Ontario, where his father taught at the University of Windsor. He did a first graduate degree at the University of Notre Dame in Indiana and a PhD at McGill University in Montreal.

MacLeod served as a judge for the 2015 Scotiabank Giller Prize.

MacLeod is also a former national level track and field runner and competed for the University of Windsor. Subsequent to his competitive running career, MacLeod captained both the 2009 and 2010 Cabot Trail Relay winning teams, the Dennis Fairall Grey Hairs.

His second short-story collection Animal Person was published in 2022.

References

Canadian male short story writers
Writers from Windsor, Ontario
Writers from Nova Scotia
Living people
Academic staff of the Saint Mary's University (Halifax)
People from Inverness County, Nova Scotia
21st-century Canadian short story writers
21st-century Canadian male writers
1972 births